The Hoomaluhia Botanical Garden (approximately 400 acres) is a botanical garden located at 45–680 Luluku Road, Kāne'ohe, Oahu, Hawaii. It is part of the Honolulu Botanical Gardens, and is open daily, without charge, except for Christmas Day and New Year's Day.

The garden was established in 1982, and designed and built by the United States Army Corps of Engineers for flood protection. It is a rainforest garden, with plantings from major tropical regions around the world, grouped into distinct collections that focus on Africa, Hawaii, India and Sri Lanka, Malaysia, Melanesia, the Philippines, Polynesia, and the tropical New World. Special emphasis is placed on conserving plants native to Hawaii and Polynesia, as well as arecaceae, aroids, and heliconias.

The garden includes a lake (32 acres) and walking trails, as well as a day use area, campgrounds, and a visitor center with lecture room, exhibition hall, workshop, and botanical library.

Images

See also
List of botanical gardens in the United States

References
Honolulu Botanical Gardens (brochure), Department of Parks and Recreation, City and County of Honolulu, Revision 1/05.

External links

 Ho'omaluhia Botanical Garden
 Hoʻomaluhia Botanical Garden, Department of Parks & Recreation, City & County of Honolulu

Honolulu Botanical Gardens
Protected areas of Oahu
1982 establishments in Hawaii
Protected areas established in 1982